Upper Lough Skeagh is a freshwater lake in the northeast of Ireland. It is located in County Cavan in the catchment of the River Boyne.

Geography

Natural history
Fish species in Upper Lough Skeagh include roach, perch, bream, pike, and the critically endangered European eel. The lake is also a public water supply.

See also
List of loughs in Ireland

References

Upper Lough Skeagh